Le déserteur (The Deserter) is a drame mélé de musique (opéra comique) by the French composer Pierre-Alexandre Monsigny with a libretto by Michel-Jean Sedaine. It was first performed on 6 March 1769 by the Comédie-Italienne at their public theatre, the Hôtel de Bourgogne in Paris.

The work was Monsigny's greatest musical success and is one of the key operas of late 18th-century French opéra comique. It was performed in Amsterdam (1769), Copenhagen (1770), Germany in German translation (1770: Hamburg and Brunswick; 1771: Frankfurt), London on 2 November 1773 in an English version by Charles Dibdin, who added music of his own and two numbers by Philidor, and was performed in New York City on 8 June 1787 in French and in Philadelphia on 11 July 1787 in English (London version). It was revived by the Paris Opéra-Comique on 28 July 1802 at the Salle Feydeau and on 30 October 1843 at the second Salle Favart, in a revised version re-orchestrated by Adolphe Adam. The company performed it over 300 times up to 1911. The work mixes serious and comic elements, an example of the latter being the behaviour of the drunkard Montauciel. The theme of a last-minute reprieve from execution influenced later rescue opera.

Roles

Synopsis
Alexis, a young soldier, is engaged to be married to Louise, a farmer's daughter. On the orders of her father, she plays a trick on him by pretending she is going to marry her cousin Bertrand instead. Alexis falls for the deception and deserts the army in despair. He is captured and thrown into jail to await execution. Louise goes to see the king to beg for mercy for Alexis. She receives a letter of reprieve but faints from exhaustion before she is able to deliver it. All ends happily, however, when the king arrives in person and frees Alexis.

Recording
Le déserteur (musical numbers only): William Sharp (Alexis), Dominique Labelle (Louise), Ann Monoyios (Jeannette), David Newman (Montauciel/Second Guard), Eugene Galvin (Jean-Louis/Third Guard), Tony Boutté (Bertrand/First Guard), Darren Perry (Courchemin), Claire Kuttler (Aunt Marguerite), Andrew Adelsberger (Jailer), Opera Lafayette Orchestra, conducted by Ryan Brown (Naxos 8.660263-64, 2010)

Adaptations 
The opera was adapted as a pantomime ballet at least three times in the eighteenth century:

 Zuchelli’s Il disertore, first produced at the King’s Theatre, London, in December 1779
 Jean Dauberval’s Le déserteur, first produced at Grand Théâtre de Bordeaux in 1772, and at the King’s Theatre, London in May 1784<ref>John V. Chapman (2004), "Jean Dauberval", pp. 351–354, in International Encyclopedia of Dance (6 volumes), edited by Selma Jeanne Cohen. Oxford: Oxford University Press.  (hardcover).  (2004 paperback edition).</ref> and the Théâtre de la Porte-Saint-Martin in 1804, in a production by Jean Aumer 
 Maximilien Gardel’s Le déserteur, ballet d'action en trois actes, first produced at  Fontainebleau on 21 October 1786 and the Paris Opéra on 16 January 1788

References

SourcesViking Opera Guide ed. Holden (1993)
  Mellace, Raffaele, Déserteur, Le, in Gelli, Piero and Poletti, Filippo (editors), Dizionario dell'opera 2008, Milan, Baldini Castoldi Dalai, 2007, p. 304,  (reproduced at Opera Manager)
 Sedaine, Michel (1769). Le déserteur: Drame en trois actes, en prose melée de musique. Par Monsieur Sedaine. La musique par M***. Représentée [sic!], pour la premiere fois, par les Comédiens Italiens ordinaires du Roi, le Lundi 6 Mars 1769, libretto, 82 pages. Paris: Chez Claude Herissant. View at Google Books.
Philippe Vendrix (ed.) L'opéra-comique en France au XVIIIe siècle'' (Mardaga, 1992)

External links
 Sung text of the Naxos recording with English translation at the Naxos web site

Operas by Pierre-Alexandre Monsigny
1769 operas
French-language operas
Operas
Rescue operas
Comédies mêlées d'ariettes